Dendrophylliidae is a family of stony corals. Most (but not all) members are azooxanthellate and thus have to capture food with their tentacles instead of relying on photosynthesis to produce their food. The World Register of Marine Species includes these genera in the family:

 Astroides Quoy & Gaimard, 1827
 Balanophyllia Wood, 1844
 Balanopsammia Ocana & Brito, 2013
 Bathypsammia Marenzeller, 1907
 Cladopsammia Lacaze-Duthiers, 1897
 Dendrophyllia de Blainville, 1830
 Dichopsammia Song, 1994
 Duncanopsammia Wells, 1936
 Eguchipsammia Cairns, 1994
 Enallopsammia Sismonda, 1871
 Endopachys Milne Edwards & Haime, 1848
 Endopsammia Milne Edwards & Haime, 1848
 Heteropsammia Milne-Edwards & Haime, 1848
 Leptopsammia Milne-Edwards & Haime, 1848
 Lobopsammia† Milne Edwards & Haime, 1848 
 Notophyllia Dennant, 1899
 Pourtalopsammia Cairns, 2001
 Rhizopsammia Verrill, 1869
 Thecopsammia Pourtalès, 1868
 Trochopsammia Pourtalès, 1878
 Tubastraea Lesson, 1829
 Turbinaria Oken, 1815

References

 
Scleractinia
Taxa named by John Edward Gray
Cnidarian families